Í, í (i-acute) is a letter in the Faroese, Hungarian, Icelandic, Czech, Slovak, and Tatar languages, where it often indicates a long /i/ vowel (ee in English word feel). This form also appears in Catalan, Irish, Italian, Occitan, Portuguese, Spanish, Aragonese, Galician, Leonese, Navajo, and Vietnamese language as a variant of the letter "i".

Usage in various languages

Faroese
Í is the 11th letter of the Faroese alphabet and represents .

Hungarian, Icelandic, Irish, Czech and Slovak
Í is the 16th letter of the Hungarian alphabet, the 12th letter of the Icelandic alphabet, the 16th letter of the Czech alphabet and the 18th letter of the Slovak alphabet. It represents .

Tatar
Í is the 14th letter of the Tatar alphabet (based on Zamanälif). It represents .

Vietnamese
In Vietnamese alphabet í is the sac tone (high-rising tone) of “i”.

Chinese
In Chinese pinyin í is the yángpíng tone (阳平, high-rising tone) of “i”.

Ibero-Romance
In Ibero-Romance languages, the "í" is not considered a letter, but the letter "i" with an accent. It is used to denote an "i" syllable with abnormal stress.

Italian
Í/í is a variant of I carrying an acute accent; it represents an /i/ carrying the tonic accent. It is used only if it is the last letter of the word except in dictionaries or when a different pronunciation may affect the meaning of a word: víola ("violates") and viòla ("violet").

Character mappings

See also
 Acute accent

I-acute